Sonny Toi Parker (born 27 August 1977 in Thames, New Zealand) is a Welsh rugby union footballer who played for the Wales national rugby union team. He played for Pontypridd and the Celtic Warriors, before moving to the Ospreys when the Warriors region collapsed. He retired from Wales because of the demands of international rugby at the end of 2005 but was brought back by Gareth Jenkins for the 2006 Autumn internationals, and was subsequently selected in Wales' 2007 World Cup squad.
Parker finished his Welsh career with 31 caps and six tries. He was the 1007th player to be capped by Wales.
In 2012, it was confirmed that he was leaving Ospreys for newly promoted English side London Welsh. Parker is now the Richmond-based side's Team Manager.

References

External links
Ospreys profile
Pontypridd profile
Wales profile
Scrum.com stats

1977 births
Living people
Pontypridd RFC players
London Welsh RFC players
Rugby union centres
Welsh rugby union players
Wales international rugby union players
Māori All Blacks players
Ospreys (rugby union) players